Buncombe County Schools (BCS) is the public school system overseeing education in Buncombe County, North Carolina, including parts of Asheville, North Carolina. The Buncombe County Schools system is the largest in Western North Carolina with almost 25,000 students enrolled in 47 schools and programs.  It is also one of only 8 school districts in North Carolina to be accredited by the Southern Association of Colleges and Schools. In 2017, BCS ranked 16th in the United States and first in the state of North Carolina for the number of National Board Certified Teachers.

Structure 

There are seven members of the Board of Education who are elected to serve four-year terms and new members are elected every two years. One candidate is elected from each of the six districts and one at-large. Candidates are elected on a nonpartisan basis. Voters in each district vote for candidates from all districts and for the at-large candidate. The Superintendent is appointed by the Board and serves as Secretary to the Board.

For 2017-18, Ms. Ann B. Franklin of the North Buncombe District serves as Madam Chair of the Board of Education. Dr. Tony Baldwin has served the Board of Education as the school superintendent since 2009.

A separate entity from the Board of Education is the Buncombe County Schools Foundation. The foundation, which was founded in 1984, supports the schools and employees with volunteers and financial contributions.

This school system is divided into six districts: Enka, Erwin, North Buncombe, Owen, Reynolds, and Roberson.  Within each school district, there is one high school, one or two middle schools, and three to five elementary schools. Some districts also host an intermediate school, serving grades 5-6; in these districts, the middle school serves grades 7 and 8.

The system offers several alternative education settings. At the high school level, an Early College and a Middle College are housed on the campus of Asheville-Buncombe Technical Community College (A-B Tech). Early College allows students to earn a high school diploma and associate degree simultaneously, while Middle College confers a high school diploma. Meanwhile, Community High School in Swannanoa, NC provides an alternative education setting for at-risk students. Finally, the Progressive Education Program serves students with intellectual disabilities in age-appropriate settings at three sites: Estes Elementary, Valley Springs Middle School, and T.C. Roberson High School. Buncombe County Schools is also home to the Martin L. Nesbitt Jr. Discovery Academy, a science, technology, engineering, and math focused magnet high school that pulls students from all six Buncombe County Schools Districts. Martin L. Nesbitt Jr. Discovery Academy was the first high school of its kind in the region and is located at the Buncombe County Schools Central Office Building.

Board of Education 
Ann B. Franklin - North Buncombe District
Pat Bryant - Erwin District
Amy Churchill - Robertson District
Max Queen - Enka District
Cindy McMahon - Reynolds District
Margaret "Peggy" Buchanan - Owen District
Amanda Simpkins - At-Large

High schools

Enka High School
Clyde A. Erwin High School
North Buncombe High School
Charles D. Owen High School
A. C. Reynolds High School
T. C. Roberson High School
Community High School
Buncombe County Early College
Buncombe County Middle College
Martin L. Nesbitt Jr. Discovery Academy

Middle schools

Enka Middle School
Clyde A. Erwin Middle School
North Buncombe Middle School
Charles D. Owen Middle School
A.C. Reynolds Middle School
Cane Creek Middle School
Valley Springs Middle School

Intermediate Schools

Charles T. Koontz Intermediate School
Enka Intermediate School
Joe P. Eblen Intermediate School
North Windy Ridge Intermediate School

Elementary schools

In the Enka District 
Candler Elementary; Hominy Valley Elementary; Pisgah Elementary; Sand Hill-Venable Elementary.

In the Erwin District 
Emma Elementary; Johnston Elementary; Leicester Elementary; West Buncombe Elementary; Woodfin Elementary.

In the North Buncombe District 
Barnardsville Elementary; North Buncombe Elementary; Weaverville Elementary; Weaverville Primary.

In the Owen District 
Black Mountain Elementary; Black Mountain Primary; W.D. Williams Elementary.

In the Reynolds District 
Charles C. Bell Elementary; Fairview Elementary; Haw Creek Elementary; Oakley Elementary.

In the Roberson District 
Avery's Creek Elementary; W. W. Estes Elementary; Glen Arden Elementary.

References

External links
 Official Site

School districts in North Carolina
Education in Buncombe County, North Carolina